Blaisdell is a surname. Notable people with the surname include:
George Blaisdell, inventory of the Zippo lighter 
Alfred Blaisdell, politician from North Dakota
Daniel Blaisdell, politician from New Hampshire
Frances Blaisdell, musician from New Jersey
Frank Ellsworth Blaisdell (1862–1946), American professor of surgery and entomologist
James A. Blaisdell, founder of the Claremont Colleges
John Blaisdell Corliss, politician from Michigan
Kealii Blaisdell, Kanaka Maoli activist and notable Hawaiian songwriter
Mike Blaisdell, Canadian ice hockey player
Neal Blaisdell, mayor of Honolulu
Neal S. Blaisdell Center, multi-purpose center in Honolulu named after the mayor
Paul Blaisdell, American artist and special effects creator
Richard Kekuni Blaisdell, professor of medicine in Honolulu
Tex Blaisdell, American comics creator
William Blaisdell, American actor

See also
Home Building & Loan Ass'n v. Blaisdell, a United States Supreme Court decision upholding a state's mortgage modification law